Douglas Martin Holcomb (February 9, 1925 – February 3, 2008) was an American professional basketball player. Holcomb played with the Baltimore Bullets of the Basketball Association of America from 1948 to 1949. He played at the collegiate level at the University of Wisconsin–Madison.

BAA career statistics

Regular season

References

1925 births
2008 deaths
American men's basketball players
Baltimore Bullets (1944–1954) players
Basketball coaches from Wisconsin
Basketball players from Wisconsin
College men's basketball head coaches in the United States
Forwards (basketball)
Scranton Royals men's basketball coaches
Undrafted National Basketball Association players
Wisconsin Badgers men's basketball players